Patrick Labaune (born 13 June 1951, in Paris) is a member of the National Assembly of France.  He represents the Drôme department,  and is a member of Les Républicains.
He is president of the Drôme General Council.

References

External links 
 Patrick Labaune's blog

1951 births
Living people
Politicians from Paris
Debout la France politicians
The Popular Right
Deputies of the 12th National Assembly of the French Fifth Republic
Deputies of the 13th National Assembly of the French Fifth Republic
Deputies of the 14th National Assembly of the French Fifth Republic
Departmental councillors (France)